The Augustinus-Lexikon is a trilingual scholarly encyclopedia under the editorship of Cornelius Petrus Mayer, Robert Dodaro, and others that has as its subject matter the life and works of St Augustine of Hippo. It is a project of the Academy of Sciences and Literature in Mainz and is in the process of being published over a number of years by Schwabe AG, a publishing house in Basel the activities of which extend over five centuries. Pope Benedict XVI is known to be among the admirers and users of this work.

See also
Augustinian Studies
Augustinianum

References

External links
 The Center for Augustinian Studies
 Augustinus-Lexikon project website

Christian encyclopedias
Augustine studies